The 1979 Alabama Crimson Tide football team (variously "Alabama", "UA" or "Bama") represented the University of Alabama in the 1979 NCAA Division I-A football season. It was the Crimson Tide's 85th overall and 46th season as a member of the Southeastern Conference (SEC). The team was led by head coach Bear Bryant, in his 22nd year, and played their home games at Bryant–Denny Stadium in Tuscaloosa and Legion Field in Birmingham, Alabama. They finished the season undefeated (12–0 overall, 6–0 in the SEC) and with a victory over Arkansas in the Sugar Bowl. For their collective efforts, the Crimson Tide were recognized as consensus national champions for the 1979 season.

In 1979 the Alabama Crimson Tide capped off a decade of remarkable success with the program's seventh perfect season in college history after 1925, 1930, 1934, 1945, 1961, and 1966 (discounting the 1897 "season" in which Bama played and won only one game). The Tide defense recorded five shutouts and allowed only two teams to score in double digits. The offense scored thirty points or more seven times.

Despite this dominance Alabama had three close calls. Against Tennessee on October 20, Alabama fell behind 17–0 in the second quarter before rallying to win 27–17. Three weeks later, against LSU, all the Tide offense could scrape up was a single field goal, but it was enough to win 3–0.  In the regular season finale against Auburn, after leading 14–3 at the half Alabama let Auburn take an 18–17 fourth quarter lead before winning 25–18. The Auburn and Tennessee games were the only two times in the 1979 season that Alabama trailed. A 24–9 victory over Arkansas capped a 12–0 season and national championship, Alabama's sixth wire service national title.

Schedule

Roster

Game summaries

at Georgia Tech

Sources:

As they entered the 1979 season, Alabama was ranked as the No. 2 team in the first AP Poll prior to their season opener against Georgia Tech. Playing before a nationally televised audience, the Crimson Tide rushed for over 300 yards in this 30–6 victory over the Yellow Jackets. Alabama took a 6–0 lead in the first quarter after E. J. Junior intercepted a Mike Kelley pass and returned it 59-yards for a touchdown. Major Ogilvie then extended their lead to 12–0 with his one-yard touchdown run late in the second quarter.

The Crimson Tide took control of the game with a pair of third quarter touchdowns that extended their lead to 27–0. Steve Whitman scored first on a thirteen-yard run and this was followed by an eleven-yard Steadman S. Shealy touchdown run. After a late Gary DeNiro interception set up a 31-yard Alan McElroy field goal, Georgia Tech scored on a 36-yard Kelley touchdown pass to Leon Chadwick that made the final score 30–6 and prevented a shutout. The victory improved Alabama's all-time record against Georgia Tech to 25–19–3.

Baylor

Sources:

Coming off their bye week, Alabama was still ranked as the No. 2 team in the AP Poll prior to their home opener against Baylor. Playing at Legion Field, the Crimson Tide shutout the Bears of the Southwest Conference 45–0 in what was the first all-time meeting between the schools. After taking a 6–0 lead on a pair of Alan McElroy field goals, Alabama led 14–0 at halftime after Major Ogilvie scored om a one-yard touchdown run in the second quarter. A 33-yard McElroy field goal in the third brought the Crimson Tide lead to 17–0 before Alabama scored four touchdowns in the fourth quarter and made the final score 45–0. Mark Nix scored the first pair on runs of two and eight-yards, followed by a one-yard Joe Jones run and John Hill scored the final points with his ten-yard touchdown run in the final minute of the game.

at Vanderbilt

Sources:

After their victory over Baylor, Alabama was still ranked as the No. 2 team in the AP Poll prior to their game against Vanderbilt. Playing at Nashville, the Crimson Tide defeated the Commodores by a blowout score of 66–3 in the conference opener. The Crimson Tide took a 14–0 first quarter lead behind touchdown runs of 65 and eight-yards by Steadman S. Shealy and Major Ogilvie. After Mike Woodard scored the only Vandy points with his 47-yard field goal, Alabama extended their lead to 32–3 at the half after Alan McElroy connected on a 21-yard field goal and touchdowns were scored on runs of 19 and one-yard by Shealy and Mark Nix.

The Crimson Tide continued their strong play into the second half as they scored five touchdowns and kept the Commodores scoreless on defense. Touchdowns were scored in the third on runs of three and one-yards by Steve Whitman and Joe Jones and in the fourth on a pair of three and a 14-yard run by Jones, Michael Landrum and John Hill. The victory improved Alabama's all-time record against Vanderbilt to 36–17–4.

Wichita State

Sources:

As they prepared for their first Tuscaloosa game of the season, Alabama retained their No. 2 position in AP Poll prior to their game against  Wichita State. In what was the only game ever played against the Shockers, the Crimson Tide won with this 38–0 shutout at Bryant–Denny Stadium. Alabama took a 28–0 lead into halftime behind a pair of touchdowns scored in each of the first two quarters. After Steadman S. Shealy connected with Keith Pugh on a 27-yard touchdown pass, Shealy scored on a three-yard run for a 14–0 first quarter lead. Major Ogilvie then gave the Crimson Tide a 28–0 halftime lead after he scored on touchdown runs of six and four-yards in the second. Alabama closed the game with an eight-yard Shealy touchdown run in the third and a 40-yard Alan McElroy field goal in the fourth that made the final score 38–0.

at Florida

Tennessee

Virginia Tech

Mississippi State

at LSU

Miami (FL)

The contest versus the Hurricanes marked the first national television broadcast from Bryant–Denny Stadium. Portable light standards had to be brought in by ABC, since the Tuscaloosa stadium lacked permanent fixtures at the time. It also marked the Alabama homecoming for former Crimson Tide assistant Howard Schnellenberger, in his first season at Miami.

vs. Auburn

References

Alabama
Alabama Crimson Tide football seasons
College football national champions
Southeastern Conference football champion seasons
Sugar Bowl champion seasons
College football undefeated seasons
Alabama Crimson Tide football